Andreea is a Romanian feminine given name. It is the feminine  of Andrei, the Romanian form of Andrew. The name Andreea become popular from the 1970s onwards, being one of the most common given names in the younger generations, ranking third in popularity among feminine names given to children born in 1989, second in 2009, and fourth in 2014.

Notable persons with that name include:

Andreea Acatrinei (born 1992), Romanian artistic gymnast
Andreea Arsine (born 1988), Romanian race walker
Andreea Bălan (born 1984), Romanian singer
Andreea Bănică (born 1978), Romanian singer
Andreea Cacovean (born 1978), Romanian artistic gymnast
Andreea Chițu (born 1988), Romanian judoka
Andreea Diaconu (born 1991), Romanian fashion model
Andreea Ehritt-Vanc (born 1973), Romanian tennis player
Andreea Esca (born 1972), Romanian television journalist
Andreea Grigore (born 1991), Romanian artistic gymnast
Andreea Isărescu (born 1984), Romanian artistic gymnast
Andreea Laiu (born 1986), Romanian association football player
Andreea Marin (born 1974), Romanian television personality
Andreea Mitu (born 1991), Romanian tennis player
Andreea Ogrăzeanu (born 1990), Romanian sprinter
Andreea Răducan (born 1983), Romanian artistic gymnast
Andreea Stefanescu (born 1993), Italian rhythmic gymnast
Andreea Ulmeanu (born 1984), Romanian artistic gymnast
Andreea Voicu (born 1996), Romanian association football player

See also
 Andrea

References

Romanian feminine given names